"Wings" is a song by Ringo Starr, originally recorded for and released as a single from the album Ringo the 4th. It was co-written with Vini Poncia in 1977. Starr later re-recorded it, produced by Starr and Bruce Sugar, and released it as a single from his 2012 studio album, Ringo 2012.

Recording
Starr on the 2012 re-recording of "Wings" was for Ringo 2012:

Release
The original version was released as a single in the US on 26 August 1977, backed with non-album track "Just a Dream".

A live version by Ringo Starr & His All-Starr Band, recorded live in Atlanta, was released on the Hurricane Sandy charity compilation Songs After Sandy: Friends of Red Hook for Sandy Relief.

Starr gave filmmakers the chance to do an official promo video for 2012 version of "Wings"; the winning video was chosen by Starr himself. Starr called it "a great little video".

Reception
Cash Box said that "the haunting melody is carried by a closely-knit ensemble of vocalists, and supported by a richly-textured horn section and stabbing guitars."  In a review for Ultimate Classic Rock, Billy Dukes calls the remake "less passionate, borderline lifeless vocal performance" when compared to the original.

Personnel
Ringo the 4th version
 Ringo Starr – lead vocals, drums
 David Spinozza – lead guitar
 Jeff Mironov or John Tropea – guitars
 Don Grolnick – keyboards
 Tony Levin – bass
 Steve Gadd – drums

Ringo 2012 version
 Ringo Starr – drums, percussion, vocals, keyboards, backing vocals
 Joe Walsh – guitar
 Benmont Tench – organ
 Bruce Sugar – piano, horn arrangement
 Amy Keys – backing vocals
 Kelly Moneymaker – backing vocals

References
 Footnotes

 Citations

2012 singles
Ringo Starr songs
Songs written by Ringo Starr
1977 songs
Songs written by Vini Poncia
1977 singles
Music published by Startling Music
Atlantic Records singles